Ballet Folklórico de México is a Mexican folkloric ensemble in Mexico City. For six decades it has presented dances in costumes that reflect the traditional culture of Mexico. The ensemble has appeared under the name Ballet Folklórico de México de Amalia Hernández.

History 

From the group's founding by Amalia Hernández in 1952, the group grew from eight performers to a fifty piece ensemble by the end of the decade. In 1959 the group officially represented Mexico at the Pan American Games in Chicago, United States. In 1963 Guillermo Keys-Arenas was the Assistant to the Director of Ballet Folklórico de México, while in 1969 he was its Artistic Coordinator.

Performances 

The music and dances reflect various regions of Mexico. Many of the ensemble's works reflect the traditions of indigenous Mesoamerican culture. Numbers of performers in individual dance numbers range from two to over thirty-five. Under Amalia Hernández the group was a pioneer of folk dance of Mexico. It is practiced by many people in America as well as Mexico.

The ensemble performs three times weekly at the Palace of Fine Arts in Mexico City. Additionally, it has toured widely in the United States and has appeared in over 80 other countries.

Recording 
In 1963 the ensemble issued a 'Living Stereo' LP record, Ballet Folklórico de México, on RCA Records of Mexico. Songs on LP record include: Flor De Piña, El Sapo, and El Patito.

Similar ensembles 
Ballet Folklórico Mexicano Ollimpaxqui and Ballet Folklórico Puro México (based in Toronto, Ontario, Canada) also present performances of traditional Mexican dances. Some alumni from Ballet Folklórico México are members of these ensembles.

See also 
 Baile Folklórico
 Music of Mexico
 List of folk dance performance groups
 Madera Folklorico

References

External links 

 Official website
 Houston Institute for Culture, discussing the diverse influences upon Mexican culture and the various regions of the nation
 Photos of the group's performances

 

Mexican culture
Latin American folk dances
Folk dance companies
Performing groups established in 1952
1952 establishments in Mexico